The Cuba Street Carnival was a street parade and creative celebration in Cuba Street, Wellington, New Zealand that was intermittently held from the 1980s and saw crowds of 10,000 - 20,000 people. It stopped in 2009 due to a lack of funding, and was revived in 2015 under the name Cubadupa.

History
The Carnival was originated and was run many times in Upper Cuba Street by Martin Wilson through the 1980s and in 1995.  Another was held on 7 and 8 December 1991 including the Whirling Circus. and another in 1993. Chris Morley-Hall re-launched the carnival in 1998. The festival involves hundreds of artists, performers, street buskers, a night street parade, and a street market. The Carnival was inspired by the Notting Hill Carnival and other raucous street parades and fairs. While it ran, it attracted crowds of approximately 10,000 to 20,000 people.

The event became biennial in 2009, in order to avoid clashing with the  New Zealand International Arts Festival.

Among the acts to have played at the festival are Fat Freddy's Drop, Trinity Roots, and The Black Seeds. Notable parade performers have included samba bands Wellington Batucada and AKSamba.

Revival
In 2011, the Creative Capital Arts Trust was established to run both Wellington's Fringe Festival and the Cuba Street Carnival. However, a date for the Cuba Street Carnival was not set. In 2012, the trust was approached by the Wellington City Council to formulate an event development plan to run the festival again.

In 2014, the Wellington City Council set aside $250,000 towards a new Cuba St festival in late March or early April 2015, which would cost about $500,000 in total. The revival is called CubaDupa.

References

External links
 https://web.archive.org/web/20060615020517/http://www.cubacarnival.org.nz/

Footage from the 2004 Carnival at Te Ara

Parades in New Zealand